Sir Albert Charles Seward FRS (9 October 1863 – 11 April 1941) was a British botanist and geologist.

Life
Seward was born in Lancaster.  His first education was at Lancaster Grammar School and he then went on to St John's College, Cambridge, intending to fulfil parents' wish that he would dedicate his life to the Church. His boyhood interest in botany and zoology soon resurfaced, helped along by inspiring lectures from William Crawford Williamson. His aptitude soon became apparent and he was appointed lecturer in botany at Cambridge University in 1890, later becoming a tutor at Emmanuel, and still later succeeding Harry Marshall Ward as Professor of Botany, Cambridge University from  1906 to 1936. There, he became a founding member of the University of Cambridge Eugenics Society, eventually becoming its Chairman. He was joint editor (with Francis Darwin) of More letters of Charles Darwin (1903). He was elected as fellow of the Royal Society in 1898 and was awarded the Murchison Medal of the Geological Society of London in 1908. In 1931 Seward dismissed the notion of a biological origin of stromatolites. This rejection became known as "Seward's folly".

Seward's studies of Mesozoic palaeobotany earned him membership of the Royal Society at the youthful age of thirty-five. He devoted a great deal of time to education, both as college and departmental administrator, and as writer on educational matters. This botanist is denoted by the author abbreviation Seward when citing a botanical name.

His interest in plants went beyond the living and the fossil. In 1935 he published a study on the floral carvings in the chapter house of Southwell Minster.

Seward died in Oxford, aged 77.

Family

His daughter married his prize pupil, John Walton son of the artist Edward Arthur Walton. John was later Professor of Botany at Glasgow University.

Timeline
1885-86 First class honours at Cambridge University
1886 Embarks on a career in palaeobotany
1890-1906 Lecturer in botany at Cambridge
1892 Sedgwick Prize for essay Fossil Plants as Tests of Climate
1894-95 Publication of "The Wealden Flora", 2 vols
1898 Fellow of the Royal Society of London
1898-1919 Publication of "Fossil Plants", 4 vols
1900-1904 Publication of "The Jurassic Flora", 2 vols
1906-36 Professor of botany at Cambridge
1908 Murchison Medal of the Geological Society of London
1909 Publication of "Darwin and Modern Science" - Essays edited by A. C. Seward
1915-36 Master of Downing College, Cambridge
1922-24 President of the Geological Society of London
1924-26 Vice-Chancellor of Cambridge
1925 Royal Medal of the Royal Society
1930 President of the Fifth International Botanical Congress
1930 Wollaston Medal of the Geological Society
1931 President of the International Union of Biological Sciences
1931 Publication of "Plant Life Through the Ages"
1934 Darwin Medal of the Royal Society
1936 Knighthood conferred
1939 President of the British Association for the Advancement of Science

Selected publications

Fossil Floras of Cape Colony (1903)
 More Letters of Charles Darwin (Volume 1, Volume 2, 1903) [with Francis Darwin]
Darwin and Modern Science (1909)
Links With the Past in the Plant World (1911)
Science and the Nation (1917)
Plant Life Through the Ages (1933)

References

External links
 
 
 

1863 births
1941 deaths
Alumni of St John's College, Cambridge
Botanists with author abbreviations
British botanists
British geologists
Charles Darwin biographers
Fellows of the Geological Society of London
Fellows of the Royal Society
Masters of Downing College, Cambridge
Paleobotanists
Presidents of the British Science Association
Royal Medal winners
Vice-Chancellors of the University of Cambridge
Wollaston Medal winners
Members of the Yorkshire Naturalists' Union
Professors of Botany (Cambridge)